Kings Lake is a lake in McLeod County, in the U.S. state of Minnesota.

Kings Lake bears the name of a pioneer settler.

See also
List of lakes in Minnesota

References

Lakes of Minnesota
Lakes of McLeod County, Minnesota